The Green Man is a legendary being primarily interpreted as a symbol of rebirth, representing  the cycle of new growth that occurs every spring. The Green Man is most commonly depicted in a sculpture, or other representation of a face which is made of, or completely surrounded by, leaves.

The Green Man motif has many variations. Branches or vines may sprout from the mouth, nostrils, or other parts of the face, and these shoots may bear flowers or fruit. Found in many cultures from many ages around the world, the Green Man is often related to natural vegetation deities. Often used as decorative architectural ornaments, Green Men are frequently found in carvings on both secular and ecclesiastical buildings. "The Green Man" is also a popular name for English public houses, and various interpretations of the name appear on inn signs, which sometimes show a full figure rather than just the face.

Some speculate that the mythology of the Green Man developed independently in the traditions of separate ancient cultures and evolved into the wide variety of examples found throughout history.

Types

Usually referred to in works on architecture as foliate heads or foliate masks, carvings of the Green Man may take many forms, naturalistic or decorative. The simplest depict a man's face peering out of dense foliage. Some may have leaves for hair, perhaps with a leafy beard. Often leaves or leafy shoots are shown growing from his open mouth and sometimes even from the nose and eyes as well. In the most abstract examples, the carving at first glance appears to be merely stylised foliage, with the facial element only becoming apparent on closer examination. The face is almost always male; green women are rare.

Lady Raglan applied the term "Green Man" to this type of architectural feature in her 1939 article The Green Man in Church Architecture in The Folklore Journal.  It is thought that her interest stemmed from carvings at St. Jerome's Church in Llangwm, Monmouthshire.

The Green Man appears in many forms, with the three most common types categorized as:

the Foliate Head: completely covered in green leaves
the Disgorging Head: spews vegetation from its mouth
the Bloodsucker Head: sprouts vegetation from all facial orifices (e.g. tear ducts, nostrils, mouth and ears)

History

In his A Little Book of The Green Man, as well as his website, Mike Harding gives examples of green man figures from Lebanon and Iraq dated to the 2nd century. Similar figures exist in Borneo, Nepal, and India.

A late 4th-century example of a green man disgorging vegetation from his mouth is found at St. Abre, in St. Hilaire-le-grand, France.

The tradition of the Green Man being carved onto Christian churches exists across Europe, including examples such as the Seven Green Men of Nicosia carved into the facade of the thirteenth century St Nicholas Church in Cyprus.

Harding references a foliate head from an 8th-century Jain temple in Rajasthan.

There are Romanesque foliate heads in 11th century Templar churches in Jerusalem. Harding tentatively suggests that the symbol may have originated in Asia Minor and been brought to Europe by travelling stone carvers.

From the Renaissance onwards, elaborate variations on the Green Man theme, often with animal heads rather than human faces, appear in many media other than carvings (including manuscripts, metalwork, bookplates, and stained glass). They seem to have been used for purely decorative effect rather than reflecting any deeply held belief. A Swiss engraver, Numa Guyot, created a bookplate depicting a Green Man in exquisite detail. It was completed circa 1887.

In Britain, the image of the Green Man enjoyed a revival in the 19th century, becoming popular with architects during the Gothic revival and the Arts and Crafts era, when it appeared as a decorative motif in and on many buildings, both religious and secular. American architects took up the motif around the same time. Many variations can be found in Neo-gothic Victorian architecture. He was very popular amongst Australian stonemasons and can be found on many secular and sacred buildings, including an example on Broadway, Sydney.

In churches
Superficially, the Green Man would appear to be pagan, perhaps a fertility figure or a nature spirit, similar to the woodwose (the wild man of the woods), and yet he frequently appears, carved in wood or stone in churches, chapels, abbeys and cathedrals, where examples can be found dating through to the 20th century.

Related characters
In one of his roles the ancient Egyptian God Osiris is regarded as a grain-deity and is commonly depicted with a green face representing vegetation, rebirth and resurrection. Containers of soil in the shape of Osiris planted with seed ("Osiris Beds") are found in some New Kingdom tombs. The sprouting grain implied the resurrection of the deceased.

Other gods depicted green are Amogha-siddhi in Tibet and Tlaloc in Mexico.

Parallels have been drawn between the Green Man and various deities, including the British Celtic Lud, also known as Nodens; Osiris, Odin, Dionysus, and even Jesus. Father Christmas, who was often shown wreathed in ivy in early depictions, has been suggested as a similar woodland spirit.

In nations such as Germany, Iceland, and England, depictions of the Green Man could have been inspired by deities such as Freyr or Odin, as both have many attributes of the later Green Men from throughout Europe.

Another explanation for the disembodied head is that it is Mímir’s head from Norse Mythology. Mímir is the uncle of Óðinn and is a God of knowledge and wisdom. His Well is located in Jötunheim, the land of Ice Giants. He is beheaded by the Vana Gods for controlling Hœnir, the Asa God chieftain, after the Asa-Vana war. The severed head is then sent to Óðinn who embalms the head with herbs and spices to stop it from rotting. He then reanimates the head and keeps it with him so Mímir’s wisdom and knowledge is not lost. After the Viking Age in the UK, some churches incorporated the green man motif in reference to knowledge and wisdom.

A character superficially similar to the Green Man, in the form of a partly foliate mask surrounded by Bacchic figures, appears at the centre of the 4th-century silver salver in the Mildenhall Treasure, found at a Roman villa site in Suffolk, England; the mask is generally agreed to represent Neptune or Oceanus and the foliation is of seaweed.

Some commentators conflate or associate the term with "Jack in the Green".  Green cats, lions, and demons are also found. On gravestones and other memorials, human skulls are sometimes shown sprouting grape vines or other vegetation, presumably as a symbol of resurrection (as at Shebbear, Devon, England).

In Sanskrit the Green Man is cognate with the gana Kirtimukha or "Face Of Glory" which is related to a lila of Shiva and Rahu. The Face of Glory is often seen in Vajrayana Buddhist Thanka art and iconography where it is often incorporated as a cloudform simulacrum, and depicted crowning the 'Wheel of Becoming' or the Bhavachakra.

Khidr or al-Khidr (Arabic: الخضر al-Khiḍr "the Green One", also transcribed as Khidar, Khizr, Khyzer, Khizar) is a revered figure in Islam, whom the Qur'an describes as a righteous servant of God who possessed great wisdom or mystic knowledge. In the Quran, al-Khidr was mentioned as a contemporary of  Moses who was said to be wiser and more knowledgeable than Moses. The 18th sura ("The Cave") presents a narrative where Khidr accompanies Moses and tests him about his oath to not ask any questions.

In Sufi theology and tradition, Khidr is identified in esoteric Sufism with the Green Man. In his book about the work of Henry Corbin and others concerning the 12th-century Muslim saint Ibn Arabi, Tom Cheetham, an authority on Islamic mysticism and Sufism, develops the idea of the Green Man/Khidr as the principle mediating between the imaginary realm and the physical world. On a similar theme, author on spirituality and architecture William Anderson writes concerning al-Khidr:
There are legends of him in which, like Osiris, he is dismembered and reborn; and prophecies connecting him, like the Green Man, with the end of time. His name means the Green One or Verdant One, he is the voice of inspiration to the aspirant and committed artist. He can come as a white light or the gleam on a blade of grass, but more often as an inner mood. The sign of his presence is the ability to work or experience with tireless enthusiasm beyond one's normal capacities. In this there may be a link across cultures, because one reason for the enthusiasm of the medieval sculptors for the Green Man may be that he was the source of every inspiration.

Popular culture

Literature

The Green Man is a recurring theme in literature. Sometimes the figures of Robin Hood and Peter Pan are associated with a Green Man, as is that of the Green Knight in Sir Gawain and the Green Knight. The Green Knight in this poem serves as both a monster antagonist and as mentor to Sir Gawain, belonging to a pre-Christian world which seems antagonistic to, but is in the end harmonious with, the Christian one.  During the post-war era literary scholars interpreted the Green Knight as being a literary representation of Lady Raglan's Green Man as described in her article "The Green Man in Church Architecture", published in the "Folklore" journal of March 1939. This association ultimately helped consolidate the belief that the Green Man was a genuine, Medieval folkloric, figure.

Sir James Frazer mentions the tradition in The Golden Bough. Kingsley Amis's novel The Green Man (1969) is about a modern incarnation of the Green Man, who, in the novel, is portrayed as an ancient pagan monster. Stephen Fry wrote a pastiche of a poem called "The Green Man" as part of his novel The Hippopotamus. In Charles Olson's book, Archaeologist of Morning, there is a poem entitled "The Green Man". Ronald Johnson also wrote a book-length poem sequence, The Book of the Green Man. The premise has even made its way into comics, most notably with the character of Swamp Thing.

In Thomas Nashe's masque Summer's Last Will and Testament (1592, printed 1600), the character commenting upon the action remarks, after the exit of "Satyrs and wood-Nymphs", "The rest of the green men have reasonable voices ...".

Green men, and variants on the theme, frequently occur in modern fantasy literature and science fiction. Tom Bombadil and the Ents in The Lord of the Rings could be considered possible examples. In Kenneth Grahame's 1908 children's classic The Wind in the Willows, a depiction of a natural deity, analogous with Pan and the Green Man legend, appears as the climax of a mystical experience within the chapter "The Piper at the Gates of Dawn". (Later, the psychedelic rock band Pink Floyd's debut studio album took its name from that chapter.) Elsewhere, Robert Jordan's series The Wheel of Time features a character named Someshta, referred to as "the Green Man". He is the sole survivor of a race called the Nym, who were originally entrusted as the gardeners of the world, and who had the ability to manipulate the life and growth of plants around them. He first appears in book one, The Eye of the World, in chapters 49 ("The Dark One Stirs") and 50 ("Meetings at the Eye"). He later reappears in book four, The Shadow Rising, in chapter 26 ("The Dedicated"), in a ter'angreal located in Rhuidean. A character called "the green man" also appears in Gene Wolfe's series The Book of the New Sun. In that story, the character is a time-traveler from a possible future of Urth (i.e. Earth) where humanity has "altered [pond scum] until it can live in our blood, and by its intervention have at last made our peace in humankind's long struggle with the sun. In us, the tiny plants live and die, and our bodies feed from them and their dead and require no other nourishment. All the famines, and all the labor of growing food, are ended."

The Cornish poet Charles Causley, the 1967 winner of the Queen's Gold Medal for Poetry wrote a poem titled Green Man In The Garden.

In the final years of the 20th century and earliest of the 21st, the appearance of the Green Man proliferated in children's literature. Examples of such novels in which the Green Man is a central character are Bel Mooney's 1997 works The Green Man and Joining the Rainbow, Jane Gardam's 1998 The Green Man, and Geraldine McCaughrean's 1998 The Stones are Hatching. Within many of these depictions, the Green Man figure absorbs and supplants a variety of other wild men and gods, in particular those which are associated with a seasonal death and rebirth. The Rotherweird Trilogy by Andrew Caldecott draws heavily on the concept of the Green Man, embodied by the Gardener Hayman Salt who is transformed into the Green Man at the climax of the first book. The Deptford Mice books by Robin Jarvis feature a benevolent deity known as the Green Mouse, worshiped by the protagonists. He is a rodent version of the Green Man.

The Green Man is an integral character in Max Porter's novel Lanny, which was longlisted for the 2019 Booker Prize. The Green Men (including a suffragist irritated by the name) and their powers figure significantly in K. J. Charles's novel The Spectred Isle (2017), which was nominated for a RITA Award.

The Green man is one of the main characters in The Midnight Guardians (by Ross Montgomery), where it is recovering its health to beat the midwinter king. He is depicted to be able to revive spirits.

The character Uncle Mike in the Mercy Thompson series by Patricia Briggs is referred to as Green Man by the Welsh character Samuel Cornick in book 3.

Sculpture
The Green Man image made a resurgence in modern times, with artists from around the world interweaving the imagery into various modes of work. English artist Paul Sivell created the Whitefield Green Man, a wood carving in a dead section of a living oak tree; David Eveleigh, an English garden designer created the Penpont Green Man Millennium Maze, in Powys, Wales ( as of 2006 the largest depiction of a Green Man image in the world); Zambian sculptor Toin Adams created the 12m-tall Green Man in Birmingham, UK as of 2006 the largest free-standing sculpture of the Green Man in the world; and sculptor M. J. Anderson created the marble sculpture titled Green Man as Original Coastal Aboriginal Man of All Time from Whence the Bush and All of Nature Sprouts from his Fingers.
Others include Jane Brideson, Australian artist Marjorie Bussey, American artist Monica Richards, and English fantasy artist Peter Pracownik, whose artwork has appeared in several media, including full-body tattoos.

American artist Rob Juszak took the theme of the Green Man as Earth's spiritual protector and turned it into a vision of the Green Man cradling the planet; Dorothy Bowen created a kimono silk painting, titled Greenwoman, as an expression of the feminine aspect of the legend.

Music

Jethro Tull performed the track Jack-in-the-Green on their 1977 album Songs from the Wood. 
The Green Man was a track by early English acid house outfit Shut Up and Dance who entered the UK charts in 1992.  A song "Greenman" by English band XTC featured on their album Apple Venus Volume 1 (lyrics included "See the Greenman blow his kiss from high church wall"). A song called "Green Man" is on American heavy metal band Type O Negative's album October Rust. The green man is the subject of Roy Harper's "The Green Man", the lead song on his album of the same name. The track "Diadem" on Waterson–Carthy's 2006 album Holy Heathens and the Old Green Man has phrases which suggest that the figure being adored is some kind of Green Man.

Theatre and festivals
The Green Man is featured in performances such as the Imbolc festival in Marsden, West Yorkshire or the Green Man Festival in Brecon Beacons, Wales, near Crickhowell.

Film and television
The Green Man is featured in several films, such as the first episode of The Canterbury Tales (Pier Paolo Pasolini, 1972) and The Draughtsman's Contract (Peter Greenaway, 1982). In the 1973 horror film The Wicker Man, the local tavern of Summerisle named 'The Green Man' is the haunt of a group of paganistic islanders. The 2012 Disney film The Odd Life of Timothy Green appears to depict a Green Man figure in its title character, a magical child who appears in the garden of a childless couple one night. He has leaves growing on his legs, takes nourishment from sunlight and returns to the earth in the fall, after fulfilling his purpose.

The Green Man has been depicted in the Netflix series The Chilling Adventures of Sabrina as an old pagan god; he is meant to bring the end to humanity, "The end of all flesh" where all humans will be pollinated and killed as sacrifices to bring the Green Man back.

The 1990 BBC series The Green Man is an adaptation of Kingsley Amis's novel of the same name and starred Albert Finney as a modern incarnation of the Green Man.

"Your Green Man" is the title of the fourth chapter of the second season of Hellier (2019), a documentary series. The episode follows paranormal investigator Tyler Strand through a remote area of North Carolina, where he finds a large Green Man symbol carved into a tree. The Green Man mythology is explored and referenced in additional episodes throughout the series.

The Green Man is part of the inspiration for Alex Garland’s 2022 horror film Men, where he features as a character.

Modern paganism

For many modern pagans, the Green Man is used as a symbol of seasonal renewal and ecological awareness.

In Wicca, the Green Man has often been used as a representation of the Horned God, a syncretic deity that incorporates aspects of, among others, the Celtic Cernunnos and the Greek Pan.

Gallery

See also
 Apple Tree Man
 Blodeuwedd
 Burryman
 Clun Green Man Festival
 Ent
 Flower Pot Men
 Gargoyle
 Green Giant
 The Green Man of Knowledge
 Grotesque
 Holly King and Oak King
 Hunky punk
 Jack in the Green
 Krampus
 Sheela na Gig
 Three hares
 Wild Man

Citations

Sources cited

Further reading
 Amis, Kingsley. The Green Man, Vintage, London (2004)   (Novel)
 Anderson, William. Green Man: The Archetype of our Oneness with the Earth, HarperCollins (1990) 
 Basford, Kathleen. The Green Man, D.S. Brewer (2004)  (The first monograph on the subject, now reprinted in paperback)
 Beer, Robert. The Encyclopedia of Tibetan Symbols and Motifs Shambhala. (1999) , 
 Cheetham, Tom. Green Man, Earth Angel: The Prophetic Tradition and the Battle for the Soul of the World , SUNY Press 2004 
 Doel, Fran and Doel, Geoff. The Green Man in Britain, Tempus Publishing Ltd (May 2001) 
 Harding, Mike. A Little Book of the Green Man, Aurium Press, London (1998) 
 Hicks, Clive. The Green Man: A Field Guide, Compass Books (August 2000) 
 MacDermott, Mercia. Explore Green Men, Explore Books, Heart of Albion Press (September 2003) 
 Matthews, John. The Quest for the Green Man, Godsfield Press Ltd (May 2004) 
 Neasham, Mary. The Spirit of the Green Man, Green Magic (December 2003) 
 Varner, Gary R. The Mythic Forest, the Green Man and the Spirit of Nature, Algora Publishing (March 4, 2006) 
 The name of the Green Man Research paper by Brandon S Centerwall from Folklore magazine

External links

 Greenman Encyclopedia Wiki A site with a comprehensive listings of locations of Green Men in the UK

Christmas characters
Church architecture
Cornish folklore
English folklore
Fairies
Iconography
Life-death-rebirth gods
Medieval legends
Mythological human hybrids
Romanesque art
Scottish folklore
Supernatural legends
Visual motifs